Tough to Handle is a 1937 American film directed by S. Roy Luby.

Plot
A reporter's grandfather wins a sweepstake, but later discovers that that is ticket was not legal. The police are looking for the con-artists that is responsible for fake tickets, so the reporter and his brother try to expose the gang.

Cast
 Frankie Darro as Mike Sanford
 Kane Richmond as Joe MacIntyre
 Phyllis Cerf as Gloria Sanford
 Harry J. Worth as Tony Franco
 Betty Burgess as Myra George
 Johnstone White as Reggie Whitney
 Burr Caruth as Grandpa Sanford
 Stanley Price as Jake

Soundtrack

External links
 
 

1937 films
1937 crime films
American black-and-white films
American crime films
Films directed by S. Roy Luby
1930s English-language films
1930s American films